Terrence Lester Erwin (born August 30, 1946 in Weymouth, Massachusetts) is a former American football player. He played college football for the Boston College Eagles and spent one season in the American Football League with the Denver Broncos.

Living people
Sportspeople from Weymouth, Massachusetts
American football running backs
Boston College Eagles football players
Denver Broncos players
1946 births